Television for identity is a three-part Argentine television serial directed by Miguel Colom, written by Marcelo Camaño and produced by Claudio Meilan.

Cast 
Micaela Brusco ... Tatiana
Celeste Cid ... Julia
Mariano Torre ... Juan Cabandié
Leonora Balcarce ... Vanina Falco
Valentina Bassi ... Esther
Sofía Elliot ... Tatiana
Carlos Belloso ... Luis Falco
Malena Solda ... Mirta Britos
Betiana Blum ... Grandmother
Graciela Tenenbaum ... Teresa Falco
Soledad Villamil ... Inés de Sfiligoy
Fabio Aste ... Carlos Sfiligoy
Alberto Fernández de Rosa ... Grandfather
Lucas Krourer ... Juan
Lucrecia Capello ... Carmen
Mario Moscoso .. Juan's uncle
Claudio Gallardou ... Patapúfete Clown
Cristina Fridman ... Cristina

References 

2000s Argentine television series
Argentine crime television series
Argentine drama television series
Telefe original programming
2007 Argentine television series debuts
2007 Argentine television series endings
International Emmy Award for Best TV Movie or Miniseries